Fantasies & Delusions is the thirteenth and final studio album composed by American singer-songwriter Billy Joel. It features his longtime friend, the British-Korean pianist Richard Hyung-ki Joo, performing compositions written by Joel and is his only studio album to contain classical compositions.

Fantasies & Delusions was originally recorded at Cove City Sound Studios, Glen Cove, New York, with help from veteran production coordinator Bill Zampino and Richie Cannata; later, the album was re-recorded in Vienna, Austria, for final release.

It was Joel's 19th album to chart on the Billboard 200, reaching No. 83 in October 2001. The album debuted at No. 1 on Billboard′s Top Classical Albums chart.

Track listing
All songs composed by Billy Joel.
Opus 3. Reverie ("Villa d'Este") – 9:31
Opus 2. Waltz #1 ("Nunley's Carousel") – 6:58
Opus 7. Aria ("Grand Canal") – 11:08
Opus 6. Invention in C Minor – 1:04
Opus 1. Soliloquy ("On a Separation") – 11:26
Opus 8. Suite for Piano ("Star-Crossed"): I. Innamorato – 7:46
Opus 8. Suite for Piano ("Star-Crossed"): II. Sorbetto – 1:30
Opus 8. Suite for Piano ("Star-Crossed"): III. Delusion – 3:37
Opus 5. Waltz #2 ("Steinway Hall") – 7:00
Opus 9. Waltz #3 ("For Lola") – 3:28
Opus 4. Fantasy ("Film Noir") – 8:56
Opus 10. Air ("Dublinesque") – 3:46

"Symphonic Fantasies for Piano and Orchestra"
In 2003, pianist Jeffrey Biegel approached Joel about a commission for a piano concerto. As an alternative, Joel suggested that Biegel create a piano concerto using pieces from Fantasies and Delusions. Biegel did so, using four of the pieces: "Fantasy (Film Noir)", "Sorbetto", "Reverie (Villa d'Este)", and "Nunley's Carousel Waltz". After Biegel had written the piano part, Nashville composer Philip Keveren composed the orchestral parts. The work, titled "Symphonic Fantasies for Piano and Orchestra", premiered on June 24, 2006 in Greensboro, North Carolina. Biegel was the pianist, accompanied by the Eastern Philharmonic Orchestra led by Stuart Malina.

Critical Reception 
In January 2002, Gramophone UK called the album "A pleasing‚ undemanding sequence of ‘classical’ pieces from one of pop’s giants"

References

2001 classical albums
Billy Joel albums
Sony Classical Records albums
Columbia Records albums
Instrumental albums
Classical albums by American artists